Gintarė Gaivenytė (born 23 April 1986) is a Lithuanian racing cyclist.

Palmarès

Track

2013
Panevezys
1st Keirin
1st Sprint
2014
Polish Cup
2nd Sprint
2nd Team Sprint (with Migle Marozaite)
3rd Keirin
2015
3rd 500m Time Trial, Panevezys

Road

References

External links 

1986 births
Living people
Lithuanian female cyclists
People from Utena
Lithuanian track cyclists